Mauricio Joselito Silvera De los Santos (born 30 December 1964) is a Uruguayan former footballer who played as a forward. He made seven appearances for the Uruguay national team from 1983 to 1987. He was also part of Uruguay's squad for the 1987 Copa América tournament.

References

External links
 
 

1964 births
Living people
Footballers from Montevideo
Uruguayan footballers
Association football forwards
Uruguay international footballers
Club Atlético River Plate (Montevideo) players
Club Nacional de Football players
Deportivo Pereira footballers
Peñarol players
Centro Atlético Fénix players
Atlético Bucaramanga footballers
C.A. Progreso players
Uruguayan expatriate footballers
Uruguayan expatriate sportspeople in Colombia
Expatriate footballers in Colombia